Typewise is a Swiss deep tech company that builds text prediction AI. In January 2022, the company filed a patent for its technology which it claims outperforms that of Google's and Apple's.

The company's first product was a virtual keyboard for Android and iOS devices. The keyboard features a self-developed hexagonal layout and a predictive typing engine suggesting the next word depending on context and multilingual language support. It includes a dark color theme as well as other designs. The keyboard supports more than 40 languages.

In December 2021, Typewise keyboard had been installed over 1.4 million times  and in January 2022, the keyboard won a Consumer Electronics Show (CES) Innovation Award for the second year running.

The company is now developing an AI writing assistant aimed at business users.

History 
Typewise was founded in May 2019 by David Eberle and Janis Berneker. Its head office is in Zurich, Switzerland.

In 2015, Eberle and Berneker initiated a Kickstarter Crowdfunding Campaign where they raised approx. USD 17,000. With those the founders launched an app prototype in 2016 under the name “WRIO Keyboard” on App Store and Play Store. In 2019, Typewise launched the app to the public. In July 2020, Typewise sought and received funding from angel investors as well as a Swiss research grant, totaling US$1.04 million, allowing for the continued development of the keyboard's artificial intelligence.

At that point, the app had amassed roughly 250,000 downloads and had approximately 65,000 active users. By November 2020, Typewise expanded its total financing to US$1.52 million, including the research grant.

In October 2021, Typewise raised another $2m via a crowdfund campaign on the platform Seedrs.

Products 
Typewise have three products: a smartphone keyboard app, an AI writing assistant, and an API.

Typewise writing assistant is a browser-based predictive text tool designed to increase the speed and quality of written communication, specifically for customer support and sales teams. The company claim it can increase productivity by 2-3 times.

Typewise keyboard is a mobile application for iOS and Android smartphones that provides features for typing on a smartphone. The app offers two keyboard layouts, the traditional QWERTY keyboard and the self-invented hexagonal layout (“honeycomb layout”) which was developed especially for typing with two thumbs.

Deleting text is done with a swipe to the left. Deleted text can be restored with a swipe back to the right. Letters can be capitalized or lowercased by swiping up or down on their respective keys, and diacritics can be added to letters by pressing and holding the corresponding key.

Typewise keyboard supports over 40 languages and allows typing in multiple languages simultaneously by means of an algorithmic language recognition. Typewise’s core technology draws on text prediction, which consists of auto-corrections and word-completion. The company collaborates with ETH Zurich’s Data Analytics Lab, supported by Innosuisse (Switzerland's Innovation Agency) to further develop the technology.

Typewise also have released an API that enables developers to use Typewise's AI on third party platforms.

Keyboard Layout 
Typewise uses a hexagonal keyboard layout that is designed to introduce fewer typos into text typed with the keyboard than a QWERTY keyboard on a mobile device. While the arrangement of the letters on the keyboard is influenced by the QWERTY layout, the hexagonal shape allows for larger keys than a rectangular layout.

Besides the shape and size of the keys, the Typewise layout features a number of differences to QWERTY and other rectangular layouts. Instead of a singular  at the bottom of the keyboard, there are two smaller space bars in the middle. A lot of keys are replaced by swipe gestures, see Features.

Artificial intelligence 

To power text prediction for the keyboard, Typewise developed an artificial intelligence with the Swiss science institute ETH Zurich. Typewise's artificial intelligence is designed to run entirely on the user's device in light of privacy concerns related to transmitting potentially sensitive user typing data over the internet. The keyboard’s text prediction technology does not send any typing data to a cloud as it runs offline.

Awards 
- CES Innovation Award 2022

- Honoree for Software & Mobile Apps 

- BOSA (Best of Swiss App Awards) 2020 – Gold for Functionality & Silver for Innovation 

- CES Innovation Award 2021 – Honoree for Software & Mobile Apps 

- Swiss AI Award – 2nd Place

References

External links 
Typewise on Google Play
Typewise on App Store (iOS)
Typewise Website

Android (operating system) software
Android virtual keyboards
IOS software
Virtual keyboards
Input methods for handheld devices